Pascack may refer to the following in New Jersey:

Pascack Brook, a tributary of the Hackensack River
Pascack Hills High School, in Montvale
Pascack Press, a weekly newspaper

See also

Pascack Valley (disambiguation)